Carey McLeod (born 14 April 1998) is a Jamaican athlete who competes in the long jump and triple jump.

McLeod studied at Kingston College in Jamaica before moving to the University of Tennessee. He placed himself among the top-10 triple-jumping collegians in NCAA indoor history, recording a mark of 17.17m to win the men’s triple jump at the SEC Championships in Fayetteville. As well as setting a new school record he surpassed the 2020 Olympic qualifying standard, in addition to being the No. 1 mark in the NCAA and No. 3 in the world for the 2020-21 indoor campaign. His efforts in both the long jump and the triple jump earned him a nomination for the NCAA indoor field event athlete of 2020. As well as the 17.17 personal best in the triple jump, at the same event in Fayetteville he jumped a personal best 8.25 in the long jump.

On 14 May 2021 he jumped 8.34m in the long jump at the Cushing Stadium in Texas to place him second on the senior list for 2021 at the time of the jump, behind JuVaughn Harrison. McLeod beat Harrison when he made that jump in Texas, who jumped 10 cm less at 8.24m for second place that day. That jump lifted McLeod to fourth on the all time Jamaican list.

References

External links
 Tennessee Volunteers bio

1998 births
Living people
Jamaican male long jumpers
Jamaican male triple jumpers
Tennessee Volunteers men's track and field athletes
Sportspeople from Kingston, Jamaica
Athletes (track and field) at the 2020 Summer Olympics
Olympic athletes of Jamaica
20th-century Jamaican people
21st-century Jamaican people